Well Loved Tales was a series of illustrated re-tellings of fairy tales and other traditional stories published by Ladybird between 1964 and the early 1990s. The books were labelled as "easy reading" and were graded depending on such aspects as their length, complexity and vocabulary. Most of the stories in the series were based on stories by Hans Christian Andersen, the Brothers Grimm and Charles Perrault, alongside a number of traditional English folk tales such as Jack and the Beanstalk and The Three Little Pigs. The first title in the series was Cinderella, and over the next decade, twenty seven titles were published, all written by Vera Southgate. In 1979, with the publication of The Ugly Duckling, Pinocchio and Tom Thumb in the series, the look and format of the books changed. The books now universally featured a green spine and back cover, as well as a standard logo. The series also broke with the Ladybird tradition of having a left page of just text and a right page of just picture, and the illustrations became more stylised than the previous editions. Older titles were gradually re-illustrated over the years. Under this new look, even more titles retold by a variety of different editors and authors came to be added over the course of the 1980s, with popular stories including Hansel and Gretel, The Little Mermaid and The Wizard of Oz.

The series gradually went out of print in the early 1990s, yet the current "Ladybird Tales" series has reused some of the original "Well Loved Tales" texts.

Reception 
Titles in the series were translated into many different languages including Arabic, German and French. Eventually sales in the series sold upwards of 80 million copies worldwide. The older books have been known to fetch quite high prices on the secondhand market; for example, first editions of "Cinderella" with a dust jacket have been known to go for as much as £150.

Perhaps due to the nostalgia for some of the earlier titles in the series, later editions with more stylised illustrations are often held by some with lesser regard. Equally, the original editions of the 1960s and 1970s have been criticised for their illustrations for being lifeless and not leaving much to the imagination. Equally, some have raised concerns over the drastic abridging of longer stories such as Pinocchio and the right to retelling distinctly literary fairy tales with a clear author such as Hans Christian Andersen.

List of tales published in the series
 The Elves and the Shoemaker
 The Three Little Pigs
 The Gingerbread Boy (narrated by Nigel Pegram)
 The Little Red Hen
 The Princess and the Pea
 The Sly Fox and the Little Red Hen
 The Three Billy Goats Gruff
 Chicken Licken
 The Enormous Turnip
 Goldilocks and the Three Bears
 The Magic Porridge Pot
 The Big Pancake (narrated by John Baddeley)
 The Old Woman and her Pig
 The Ugly Duckling (narrated by John Baddeley)
 The Emperor's New Clothes
 Thumbelina (narrated by John Baddeley)
 Town Mouse and Country Mouse
 The Tinder Box
 The Twelve Dancing Princesses
 Sleeping Beauty
 Dick Whittington and his Cat
 Puss in Boots
 Rumpelstiltskin
 Rapunzel
 The Wolf and the Seven Young Kids
 Little Red Riding Hood
 The Musicians of Bremen
 Pinocchio
 The Golden Goose
 Hansel and Gretel
 The Goose Girl
 The Brave Little Tailor
 The Emperor and the Nightingale
 The Pied Piper of Hamelin (narrated by Roger Blake)
 Cinderella
 Jack and the Beanstalk
 Beauty and the Beast
 Snow White and Rose Red
 Snow White and the Seven Dwarfs
 The Princess and the Frog (narrated by John Baddeley)
 Tom Thumb
 The Little Mermaid
 The Sorcerer's Apprentice (narrated by Nigel Pegram)
 The Snow Queen
 The Wizard of Oz
 The Firebird
 Peter and the Wolf

References

External links 

  Collectors' site dedicated to old Ladybird books
  Collectors' site featuring Ladybird cover art, including editions in different languages
  Collectors' site featuring covers of books in addition to information on authors and illustrators
  Collectors' site featuring key information on the "Well Loved Tales" series.

Series of children's books
British children's books
Children's short story collections
Works based on fairy tales